Bosnia and Herzegovina first participated at the European Youth Olympic Festival at the 1995 Winter Festival and has earned medals at both summer and winter festivals. Bosnia and Herzegovina hosted the 2019 Winter Festival.

Medal tables

Medals by Summer Youth Olympic Festival

Medals by Winter Youth Olympic Festival

Medals by summer sport

List of medalists

Summer Festivals

See also
 Bosnia and Herzegovina at the Olympics
 Bosnia and Herzegovina at the Paralympics
 Bosnia and Herzegovina at the European Games

References
 Summer EYOF - Olympic Committee of Bosnia and Herzegovina
 Winter EYOF - Olympic Committee of Bosnia and Herzegovina

Youth sport in Bosnia and Herzegovina
Nations at the European Youth Olympic Festival
Bosnia and Herzegovina at multi-sport events